Helastia is a genus of moths in the family Geometridae erected by Achille Guenée. It is considered by some to be a synonym of Larentia. This genus was redefined and described in 1987 by Robin C. Craw. This genus is endemic to New Zealand.

Species
Helastia alba Craw, 1987
Helastia angusta Craw, 1987
Helastia christinae Craw, 1987
Helastia cinerearia (Doubleday, 1843)
Helastia clandestina (Philpott, 1921)
Helastia corcularia (Guenée, 1868)
Helastia cryptica Craw, 1987
Helastia cymozeucta (Meyrick, 1913)
Helastia expolita (Philpott, 1917)
Helastia farinata (Warren, 1896)
Helastia mutabilis Craw, 1987
Helastia ohauensis Craw, 1987
Helastia plumbea (Philpott, 1915)
Helastia salmoni Craw, 1987
Helastia scissa Craw, 1987
Helastia semisignata (Walker, 1862)
Helastia siris (Hawthorne, 1897)
Helastia triphragma (Meyrick, 1883)

References

Larentiini
Endemic fauna of New Zealand
Taxa named by Achille Guenée
Endemic moths of New Zealand
Geometridae genera